Yayathi is a 1938 Indian, Tamil language film directed by M. L. Tandon. The film featured P. U. Chinnappa and M. V. Rajamma in the lead roles.

Plot
The story was based on the life of a puranic king Yayati found in Mahabharata, Adi Parva.

Cast
The list is compiled from the database of Film News Anandan and from the review article by Randor Guy

Male cast
P. U. Chinnappa
P. B. Rangachari
C. S. Shamanna
M. S. Subramania Bhagavathar
M. S. Babu
K. S. Harihara Iyer

Female cast
M. V. Rajamma
C. S. M. Sulochana
T. S. Krishnaveni
S. C. Gomathi Bai
M. L. Rajambal

Production
The film was produced by Mohan Movietone of Madurai, and was directed by the Hollywood-trained filmmaker Manik Lal Tandon. The film was made in Calcutta.

An info is found in the review article that said, as reportedly said by M. V. Rajamma, that there were clashes between Chinnappa and Tandon during the shooting of the film and it was rumoured that the actor slapped the film maker.

Soundtrack
Music was composed by Papanasam Sivan who also penned the lyrics. There were 25 songs in the film and some are available as 78 rpm records now. The available songs are sung by P. U. Chinnappa.

Reception
Writing in the Hindu review article in 2010, Randor Guy says the film is remembered for "Chinnappa's performance and Tandon's deft direction."

References

Hindu mythological films
Films based on the Mahabharata
Indian black-and-white films
Films scored by Papanasam Sivan